Eratoneura era is a species of leafhopper in the family Cicadellidae. It is found in the eastern United States.

References

External links

 

Insects described in 1920
Erythroneurini